Vasili Vasilyevich Potekhin (born 17 September 1974) is a former Russian professional footballer.

Club career
He made his professional debut in the Soviet Second League B in 1991 for FC Angara Angarsk. He played 3 games in the UEFA Intertoto Cup 1998 for FC Shinnik Yaroslavl.

References

1974 births
People from Bratsk
Living people
Soviet footballers
Russian footballers
Russia youth international footballers
Association football defenders
FC Shinnik Yaroslavl players
FC Volgar Astrakhan players
FC Metallurg Lipetsk players
FC Luch Vladivostok players
Russian Premier League players
FC Spartak-MZhK Ryazan players
Sportspeople from Irkutsk Oblast